Ferenc Bene (17 December 1944 – 27 February 2006) was a Hungarian football player of Újpesti Dózsa, who was a member of the team that won the gold medal at the 1964 Summer Olympics in Tokyo, Japan. A striker, he was the top scorer of the tournament (12 goals in 5 matches).

Bene was born in Balatonújlak. He played his first international match against Yugoslavia on 14 October 1962, and his last against Czechoslovakia on 12 September 1979. He obtained 76 caps and scored 36 goals. He was bronze medallist at the European Championship of 1964, and a quarter-finalist at the World Cup of 1966 (at the latter event he was the top scorer of the Hungarian national team). Bene was named Hungarian Footballer of the Year in 1964 and 1969. He died in Budapest, after a lengthy treatment following a fall at the end of 2005. His son Ferenc Bene jr. is also a former player, currently working as a coach.

He played for the following teams:
Újpesti Dózsa (1961–1978)
Volán SC (1978–79, 1983–84)
Sepsi-78, Finland (1981–82)
Soroksári VOSE (1984)
Kecskeméti SC (1985)

Career statistics

Honours
Hungary
 Olympic Games: 1964

Individual
UEFA European Championship Team of the Tournament: 1964

See also 
 List of men's footballers with 500 or more goals

References

External links 
 
 
 



1944 births
2006 deaths
Hungarian footballers
Association football forwards
Hungarian expatriate footballers
Hungary international footballers
Olympic footballers of Hungary
Olympic gold medalists for Hungary
Olympic medalists in football
Footballers at the 1964 Summer Olympics
Medalists at the 1964 Summer Olympics
1964 European Nations' Cup players
1966 FIFA World Cup players
UEFA Euro 1972 players
Újpest FC players
Volán FC players
Expatriate footballers in Finland
Sepsi-78 players
Hungarian expatriate sportspeople in Finland
Soroksári TE footballers
Kecskeméti TE players
Hungarian football managers
Újpest FC managers
Nemzeti Bajnokság I players
Sportspeople from Somogy County
Nemzeti Bajnokság I managers